Dermatias platynogaster is a species of dreamer (type of deep-sea anglerfish) found in the western Pacific Ocean where it occurs at depths of  in the waters around the Philippines and in the area of the Magellan Seamounts. This species is the only known member of its genus.

References

Oneirodidae
Taxa named by Hugh McCormick Smith
Taxa named by Lewis Radcliffe
Fish described in 1912